E. T. Taison Master is the member of 15th Kerala State Legislative Assembly.

He is son of Shri E. C. Thomas and Smt. Anasthassia Thomas; born at Edavilangu, Thrissur on 20 January 1965. He studied Pre-Degree from MES Asmabi College, Kodungallur and Teachers Training Course (T.T.C) from Krishna Teachers Training Institute, Panangad. He worked as a Headmaster in High Schools in Thrissur District. He was a Member of C.P.I. District Committee, Thrissur; Secretary, C.P.I. Kaipamangalam Mandalam; Member, Edavilangu Grama Panchayat, Kodungallur Block Panchayat, Thrissur Jilla Panchayat.
 
Now, President, Manava Karunyasangam; Chairman, Bahadoor Smrithi Kendram; Patron, Daya Sadhu Jana Samrakshana Samithi.

References

Malayali politicians
People from Thrissur district
Communist Party of India politicians from Kerala
Living people
1965 births
Kerala MLAs 2016–2021